Ye Olde Tavern may refer to:

 Ye Olde Tavern, Kington, a pub in Herefordshire, England
 Ye Olde Tavern (Iowa), a former restaurant in the United States
 Ye Olde Tavern, Vermont, a restaurant in the United States

See also 

 Old Tavern (disambiguation)